The Crocker jungle flycatcher (Cyornis ruficrissa) is a species of passerine bird in the Old World flycatcher family Muscicapidae. It is endemic to Borneo. Its natural habitat is subtropical or tropical moist montane forests.

The  Crocker jungle flycatcher was split from the rufous-tailed jungle flycatcher (Cyornis rufocauda) as distinct species by the IOC in 2021.

References

Cyornis
Birds described in 1887
Endemic birds of Borneo
Taxa named by Richard Bowdler Sharpe